Person Place, also known as Prudence Person House, is a historic home located at Louisburg, Franklin County, North Carolina.   It consists of a large two-story, three bay, Federal style main block built about 1789, with a -story, three bay Georgian wing.  The front facade features a small three bay pedimented porch supported by four wooden Doric order columns.  It also has two brick chimneys with concave shoulders.

It was listed on the National Register of Historic Places in 1972.

References

External links

Historic American Buildings Survey in North Carolina
Houses on the National Register of Historic Places in North Carolina
Houses completed in 1789
Georgian architecture in North Carolina
Federal architecture in North Carolina
Houses in Franklin County, North Carolina
National Register of Historic Places in Franklin County, North Carolina
1789 establishments in North Carolina